Seth et Holth is a Japanese film released on September 29, 1993, best noted for starring musicians hide and Tusk. The film is based on an original short story by hide and features the tragic plot of two beings from a different plane of existence coming to earth, specifically Tokyo, and being overwhelmed by the city' sensory overload. The two communicate through swapping blood, and are persecuted and executed.

Plot

In the sphere of Athum there once lived two beautiful angels by the names of  Seth and Holth.  Seth was gentle, kind, and anxious one; Holth was strong, determined, and bold.  They lived in peace in the sphere of Athum for eternity, since there is no time, nor age, nor decay in this world. The waters flow uphill and time is irrelevant.  Athum takes all and creates everything, for eternity.  The angels Seth and Holth lived there undisturbed forever.  They made love by their eyes, tasting their tears, they spoke to each other by their blood. They slept in Athum's womb not knowing of any evil, plight or fear. No worry, no pain ever harmed them... and they could have gone on like this forever, if not one day bold Holth had started to ask questions... questions about other worlds, other beings, questions about life and death.

He tried to force Athum to tell him but instead for an answer the angels Seth and Holth were banished to planet Earth, thrown into the harshness of light, noise and madness.  They woke up from their eternal dream to find themselves reborn to a world full of questions; hectic and evil.  Not knowing what to do, only trying to get home again, home to Athum, home to peace.

Hunted down by humans who did not understand, nor ever loved, Seth and Holth were sacrificed and murdered.  Seeing their plight in the human world Athum pitied them and allowed them to return home, but home was not the same anymore.  They had seen too much, heard too much, felt too much in the human world.  They lost their innocence and their faith, they could ignore the questions no longer.

Cast
hide from X Japan as Seth
Tusk from Zi:Kill as Holth

Names
Seth or Set is an Egyptian god. Holth may be Horus, if pronounced as the Japanese would, but with wrong romanization. Using foreign, "exotic" mythologies is common in Japanese pop culture.

Credits
Planning and basic conception: hide and Tusk
Music composition: hide
Lyrics & vocals: Tusk
Producer/Script: Hideaki Utsumi (Fool's Mate)
Co-producer: Takahiro Ishii (Fool's Mate)

Soundtrack
 "Eyes"
 "Descent to Earth"
 "Crosses Everywhere"
 "The Church"
 "Running ~Persecution"
 "Sacrifice ~Death"
 "Ending Theme ~Music Box"

References

External links

1993 films
Films shot in Tokyo
Japanese avant-garde and experimental films
Japanese fantasy films
Japanese science fiction films
Hide (musician)
1990s Japanese films